Delmarva, is a large peninsula state on the East Coast of the United States, occupied by the vast majority of The Chesapeake Bay and parts of the Eastern Shore regions of Maryland and Virginia. It is bordered by the Chesapeake Bay on the west, Pocomoke Sound on the southwest, and the Delaware River, Delaware Bay, and the Atlantic Ocean on the east.

Etymology
In older sources, the peninsula between Delaware Bay and Chesapeake Bay was referred to variously as the Delaware and Chesapeake Peninsula or simply the Chesapeake Peninsula.

The toponym Delmarva is a clipped compound of Delaware, Maryland, and Virginia (official abbreviation VA), which in turn was modeled after Delmar, a border town named after two of those states. While Delmar was founded and named in 1859, the earliest uses of the name Delmarva occurred several decades later (for example on February 10, 1877, in The Middletown Transcript newspaper in Middletown, Delaware) and appear to have been commercial; for example, the Delmarva Heat, Light, and Refrigerating Corp. of Chincoteague, Virginia, was in existence by 1913—but general use of the term did not occur until the 1920s.

Geography
 At the northern point of the peninsula there is a geographic fall line that separates the crystalline rocks of the Piedmont from the unconsolidated sediments of the Coastal Plain. This line passes through Newark, Delaware, and Wilmington, Delaware, and Elkton, Maryland.  The northern isthmus of the peninsula is transected by the sea-level Chesapeake and Delaware Canal. Several bridges cross the canal, and the Chesapeake Bay Bridge and the Chesapeake Bay Bridge–Tunnel join the peninsula to mainland Maryland and Virginia, respectively. Another point of access is Lewes, Delaware, reachable by the Cape May–Lewes Ferry from Cape May, New Jersey.

Dover, Delaware, is the peninsula's largest city by population. The main commercial areas are Dover in the north and Salisbury, Maryland, near its center.

Cape Charles forms the southern tip of the peninsula in Virginia.

The fall line, found in the region southwest of Wilmington, Delaware, and just north of the northern edge of the Delmarva Peninsula, is a geographic borderland where the Piedmont region transitions into the coastal plain. Its Atlantic Ocean coast is formed by the Virginia Barrier Islands in the south and Cape Henlopen in the north, encompassing Ocean City, Maryland, and the Delaware Beaches from Fenwick Island to Lewes.
The peninsula has a humid subtropical climate (Cfa) according to the Köppen climate classification. According to the Trewartha climate classification, the northern half has a temperate or oceanic climate (Do.)

Culture
The culture of Delmarva is starkly different from the rest of the Mid-Atlantic region and is much like that of the Southern United States. While the northern portion of Delmarva, such as the Wilmington metro area, is similar to the urban regions of Philadelphia, the Maryland and Virginia Delmarva counties (as well as the southern two counties in Delaware) are more conservative than their "mainland" counties. It has been suggested that Delmarva residents have a variation of Southern American English which is particularly prevalent in rural areas.

Delmarva is driven by agriculture and commercial fishing. Most of the land is rural, with a few large population centers, though tourism has been an important part of the region.

Delmarva has longstanding Catholic roots, but now Protestants are more numerous, with Methodism being particularly strongly represented. Numerous Catholic churches dating to the 17th century are still extant, such as Old Bohemia Church, which is dedicated to Saint Francis Xavier in Wicomico County, Maryland. There are also many historically significant Episcopalian churches, such as Old Trinity Church in southern Dorchester County and Christ Church in Cambridge, Maryland.

Political divisions

The border between Maryland and Delaware, which resulted from the 80-year-long Penn–Calvert Boundary Dispute, consists of the east–west Transpeninsular Line and the perpendicular north–south portion of the Mason–Dixon line extending north to just beyond its tangential intersection with the Twelve-Mile Circle which forms Delaware's border with Pennsylvania. The border between Maryland and Virginia on the peninsula follows the Pocomoke River from the Chesapeake to a series of straight surveyed lines connecting the Pocomoke to the Atlantic Ocean.

All three counties in Delaware—New Castle (partially), Kent, and Sussex—are located on the peninsula. Of the 23 counties in Maryland, nine are on the Eastern Shore: Kent, Queen Anne's, Talbot, Caroline, Dorchester, Wicomico, Somerset, and Worcester, as well as a portion of Cecil County.  Two Virginia counties are on the peninsula: Accomack and Northampton.

The following is a list of some of the notable cities and towns on the peninsula.
 Cambridge, Maryland, is the county seat of Dorchester County and a busy port on the Choptank River.
 Centreville, Maryland, is the county seat of Queen Anne's County.
 Chestertown, Maryland, is the county seat of Kent County, MD and the home of Washington College.
 Chincoteague, Virginia, is noted for its wild ponies and its beaches, administered by the U.S. Fish & Wildlife Service through Chincoteague National Wildlife Refuge.
 Crisfield, Maryland, is a notable source of seafood.
 Delmar, Maryland, part of the Salisbury Urbanized Area, lies across the Maryland-Delaware border from its twin, Delmar, Delaware, on the Transpeninsular Line.
 Dover, Delaware, is the Delaware state capital and the peninsula's largest city in terms of population. It is also the county seat of Kent County, DE. 
 Easton, Maryland, is the county seat of Talbot County.
 Georgetown, Delaware, is the county seat of Sussex County. Return Day, a biennial tradition dating back to the Colonial era, is held in Georgetown two days after Election Day.
 Lewes, Delaware, is the site of the first European colonization in Delaware, is nicknamed "the first town in the first state", and is a port city for the Cape May–Lewes Ferry.
 Ocean City, Maryland, is a popular beach and resort town.
 Princess Anne, Maryland, is the county seat of Somerset County and the home of the University of Maryland Eastern Shore.
 Rehoboth Beach, Delaware, "the Nation's Summer Capital", has a sixteenfold increase in population from winter to summer.
 St. Michaels, Maryland, is a popular tourist destination.
 Salisbury, Maryland, is the county seat of Wicomico County, the second largest city in the peninsula and the lower peninsula's only urbanized area. It is known as the "Crossroads of Delmarva". It is home to the Salisbury–Ocean City–Wicomico Regional Airport, the only airport on the peninsula with scheduled commercial flights.  The city is also home to Salisbury University, a Maryland state university.  
 Seaford, Delaware, the "Nylon Capital of the World", is the largest city in Sussex County.

At its southern tip, the Delmarva Peninsula is connected to Virginia Beach and Hampton Roads, Virginia, via the Chesapeake Bay Bridge-Tunnel which opened in 1964. The bridge tunnel is owned and administered by the Chesapeake Bay Bridge and Tunnel District.

Largest municipalities

Proposed state
At various times in history, residents of the Delmarva Peninsula have proposed that its Maryland and Virginia portions secede from their respective states, merging with Kent County and Sussex County, Delaware, to create the state of Delmarva. A Delmarva State Party with this aim was founded in 1992. Its combined population would be about 750,000, or 977,511 in 2015, or 1,534,290 if New Castle County, Delaware, is also included, roughly the population of Idaho, or West Virginia.

Legislative attempts to break away the Eastern Shore counties of Maryland and join them with Delaware were made several times. In November 1776, delegates from the Eastern Shore attempted to insert a clause into the Maryland Declaration of Rights that would allow the shore counties to secede from Maryland, with the clause being defeated 30–17. In 1833, the secession movement came close to succeeding: a Delaware resolution proposing the Eastern Shore of Maryland be absorbed into Delaware passed the Delaware Senate and Delaware House of Representatives, then passed the Maryland House of Delegates with a 40–24 vote, but failed to be voted out of committee by the Maryland Senate. The following year, a Caroline County representative proposed allowing the Eastern Shore to secede via referendum, but the Maryland House of Delegates voted 60–5 to indefinitely postpone the measure, and that proposal was never taken up again. In 1851, Dorchester County delegate and future Maryland Governor Thomas Holliday Hicks proposed an amendment that would give the Eastern Shore the right to vote itself into Delaware, but the amendment failed 51–27.

History

Pre-colonization 
Some studies have shown that Native Americans inhabited the peninsula from about 10,000 BC to 8000 BC – since the last ice age.

Recent research indicates that Paleoamericans inhabited Maryland during the pre-Clovis period (before 13,000 BP). Miles Point, Oyster Cove, and Cator's Cove archaeological sites on the coastal plain of the Delmarva Peninsula help to document a pre-Clovis presence in the Middle Atlantic region. Thus, these sites suggest a human presence in the Middle Atlantic region during the Last Glacial Maximum.

In 1970 a stone tool (a biface) said to resemble Solutrean stone tools was dredged up by the trawler Cinmar off the east coast of Virginia in an area that would have been dry land prior to the rising sea levels of the Pleistocene Epoch. The tool was allegedly found in the same dredge load that contained a mastodon's remains. The mastodon tusks were later determined to be 22,000 years old. In addition several archaeological sites on the Delmarva peninsula with suggestive (but not definitive) dating between 16,000 and 18,000 years have been discovered by Darrin Lowery of the University of Delaware. These factors led Stanford and Bradley to reiterate in 2014 their academic advocacy of pre-Clovis peoples in North America and their possible link to paleolithic Europeans.

Lifestyles
Native settlements relocated as natural conditions dictated. They set up villages – scattered groups of thatch houses and cultivated gardens – where conditions favored farming. In the spring they planted crops, which the women and children tended while the men hunted and fished. In the fall they harvested crops, storing food in baskets or underground pits. During the harsh winter, whole communities would move to hunting areas, seeking the deer, rabbit and other game that kept them alive until the spring fishing season. When the farmland around their villages became less productive – the inhabitants did not practice crop rotation – the native people would abandon the site and move to another location.

Populations
The primary Indigenous peoples of the ocean side of the lower peninsula prior to the arrival of Europeans were the Assateague, including the Assateague, Transquakin, Choptico, Moteawaughkin, Quequashkecaquick, Hatsawap, Wachetak, Marauqhquaick, and Manaskson. Their territories and populations ranged from Cape Charles, Virginia, to the Indian River inlet in Delaware.

The upper peninsula and the Chesapeake shore was the home of Nanticoke-speaking people such as the Nentigo and Choptank. The Assateague and Nentigo made a number of treaties with the colony of Maryland, but the land was gradually taken and those treaties dissolved for the use of the colonists, and the native peoples of the peninsula assimilated into other Algonquian tribes as far north as Ontario.

Currently, the peninsula is within the traditional territory of the Piscataway, Nentego, and Lenape peoples.

Colonization

In 1566, an expedition sent from Spanish Florida by Pedro Menéndez de Avilés reached the Delmarva Peninsula. The expedition consisted of two Dominican friars, thirty soldiers and an indigenous Virginia boy, Don Luis, in an effort to set up a Spanish colony in the Chesapeake. At the time, the Spanish believed the Chesapeake to be an opening to the fabled Northwest Passage. However, a storm thwarted their attempts at establishing a colony. The land that is currently Delaware was first colonized by the Dutch West India Company in 1631 as Zwaanendael. That colony lasted one year before a dispute with local Indians led to its destruction. In 1638, New Sweden was established which colonized the northern part of the state, together with the Delaware Valley. Eventually, the Dutch, who had maintained that their claim to Delaware arose from the colony of 1631, recaptured Delaware and incorporated the colony into the Colony of New Netherland.

However, shortly thereafter Delaware came under British control in 1664. James I of England had granted Virginia 400 miles of Atlantic coast centered on Cape Comfort, extending west to the Pacific Ocean to a company of colonists in a series of charters from 1606 to 1611. This included a piece of the peninsula. The land was transferred from the Duke of York to William Penn in 1682 and was governed with Pennsylvania. The exact border was determined by the Chancery Court in 1735. In 1776, the counties of Kent, New Castle, and Sussex declared their independence from Pennsylvania and entered the United States as the state of Delaware.

In the 1632 Charter of Maryland, King Charles I of England granted "all that Part of the Peninsula, or Chersonese, lying in the Parts of America, between the Ocean on the East and the Bay of Chesapeake on the West, divided from the Residue thereof by a Right Line drawn from the Promontory, or Head-Land, called Watkin's Point, situate upon the Bay aforesaid, near the river Wigloo, on the West, unto the main Ocean on the East; and between that Boundary on the South, unto that Part of the Bay of Delaware on the North, which lieth under the Fortieth Degree of North Latitude from the Equinoctial, where New England is terminated" to Cecil Calvert, 2nd Baron Baltimore, as the colony of Maryland. This would have included all of present-day Delaware; however, a clause in the charter granted only that part of the peninsula that had not already been colonized by Europeans by 1632. Over a century later, it was decided in the case of Penn v Lord Baltimore that, because the Dutch had colonized Zwaanendael in 1631, the portion of Maryland's charter granting Delaware to Maryland was void.

Economy
The peninsula was the premier location for truck farming of vegetables during the 19th and early 20th centuries. Though it has been largely eclipsed by California's production, the area still produces significant quantities of tomatoes, green beans, corn, soybeans—Queen Anne's County is the largest producer of soy beans in Maryland—and other popular vegetables.

The Eastern Shore is also known for its poultry farms, the most well-known of which is Perdue Farms, founded in Salisbury. The Delaware is a rare breed of chicken created on the peninsula.

Tourism is a major contributor to the peninsula's economy with the beaches at Rehoboth Beach, Delaware, Ocean City, Maryland, Assateague Island National Seashore, Maryland, and Chincoteague National Wildlife Refuge, Virginia, being popular tourist destinations.

Salisbury University also adds to the economic activity of the Delmarva, with an estimated $480 million in contribution impact. The University is the largest four year comprehensive on the Eastern Shore, and serves as the largest employer other than Perdue supporting an estimated 3,200 jobs.

Media
The area is served by four television markets. Cecil, Kent, Queen Anne's, Caroline and Talbot Counties in Maryland are primarily served by the Baltimore, Maryland, designated market area and stations WBAL-TV, WJZ-TV, WMAR-TV and WBFF-TV. New Castle and Kent Counties in Delaware are served by the Philadelphia, Pennsylvania, designated market area and stations WPVI-TV, WCAU-TV, KYW-TV and WTXF-TV. Sussex, Dorchester, Wicomico, Worcester and Somerset Counties are served by the Salisbury, Maryland, designated market area, the only based on the peninsula. These stations are WBOC-TV, WMDT-TV, and WRDE-LD. Accomack and Northampton Counties are primarily served by the Norfolk/Virginia Beach designated market area and stations WAVY-TV, WVEC-TV and WTKR-TV.

Transportation
The peninsula has minor airports with few commercial carriers, as it is overshadowed by proximate major airports in Baltimore and Philadelphia. Its airports include Wilmington Airport southwest of Wilmington, Delaware, Salisbury Regional Airport to the southeast of Salisbury, Maryland, and Dover Air Force Base to the southeast of Dover, Delaware.

Major north–south highways include U.S. 9, U.S. 13, U.S. 50 and U.S. 301. Highways U.S. 50 and U.S. 301 run over the Chesapeake Bay Bridge on the western side of the peninsula. U.S. 13 at the southern limit of the peninsula connects through the Chesapeake Bay Bridge–Tunnel to the main part of Virginia.

Until 1957, the Pennsylvania Railroad provided service to the peninsula. It ran the Del-Mar-Va Express day train from New York City, through Wilmington, Dover, Delmar, Salisbury, and Pocomoke City to the Cape Charles, Virginia, ferry docks and it ran the Cavalier counterpart night train. At that point, ferries ran to Norfolk, Virginia.  In earlier decades branches ran to Centreville, Maryland; Oxford, Maryland; Cambridge, Maryland; Georgetown and Lewes, Delaware; and to Franklin City, Virginia. Today, the Delmarva Central Railroad provides freight and tanker transportation on the peninsula.

See also

 Delmarva Shorebirds
 List of railroad lines in the Delmarva Peninsula
 List of U.S. multistate regions
 Wallops Flight Facility

References

External links

 The Delmarva Peninsula
 
 
 
 Delmarva Peninsula census tracts United States Census Bureau
 The Confederation of Sovereign Nanticoke-Lenape Tribes
 Piscataway Conoy Tribe

Geographical neologisms
Geography of Kent County, Delaware
Landforms of New Castle County, Delaware
Landforms of Sussex County, Delaware
Peninsulas of Delaware
Peninsulas of Maryland
Peninsulas of Virginia
Pre-Clovis archaeological sites in the Americas
Regions of the United States
1850s neologisms